The Noord-Friesche Locaalspoorweg-Maatschappij (North Friesland Railway) was a railway serving the sparsely populated north of the Dutch province of Friesland. It was operated by the North Friesland Local Railway Company (Dutch: Noord-Friesche Locaalspoorweg-Maatschappij (NFLS)). It was what would be known in the UK as a light railway.

History
The NFLS had a network of lines in north Friesland. The lines opened in eight stages:

Wetsens station closed in May 1902, less than eight months after opening. On 1 December 1905, the NFLS was taken over by the Hollandsche IJzeren Spoorweg-Maatschappij (HSM), which itself was nationalised on 1 December 1938, becoming part of Nederlandse Spoorwegen (NS).

Locomotives
The NFLS had a fleet of 10 2-4-2T locomotives, numbered 1-10. They became HSM 1051-60 and later the NS 7101-10. The locomotives cost f23,300 each and were built by Hohenzollern.

Carriages
The NFLS had the following passenger stock, all built by Nederlandsche Fabriek van Werktuigen & Spoorwegmaterieel, Amsterdam:

Goods wagons
The NFLS had the following foods stock:

The rolling stock was all built by Nederlandsche Fabriek van Werktuigen & Spoorwegmaterieel, Amsterdam except for the two 6,500 litre water tanker, which were built by Nivelles in 1896, and thus acquired second hand.

Closures
The lines were closed in stages, with some short term reopenings taking place during the Second World War:

Stations

Leeuwarden - Anjum line
All distances are from Leeuwarden station.

Leeuwarden 
Leeuwarden Rijksweg 
Leeuwarden Rijksweg (or Halte) station was demolished in 1970
Jelsum 
Jelsum station was demolished in 1944.
Cornjum 
Britsum 

Stiens 
Finkum 
Finkum station was demolished by 1970
Hijum 
Hallum 
Hallum station was demolished in 1970

Marrum-Westenijkerk 
Ferwerd 
Ferwerd station was demolished in 1974
Blija 
Holwerd 
Ternaard 
Hantum 
Hantum station was demolished by 1960.
Dokkum-Aalsum 
Dokkum-Aalsum station was demolished in 1974.
Wetsens 
Wetsens station closed in May 1902.
Metslawier 
Morra-Lioessens 
Anjum

Stiens - Harlingen line
Vrouwbuurtstermolen 13 km
Vrouwenparochie 14 km (Vrouwenparochie station was demolished in 2002).
Langhuisterweg 16 km
St. Annaparochie 17 km
Koudeweg 19 km
St. Jacobiparochie 21 km (St. Jabobiparochie station was demolished by 1960).
Minnertsga 24 km
Firdgum 26 km
Tzummarum 27 km
Oosterbierum 30 km
Oosterbierum station was demolished by 1980.
Sexbierum-Pieterbierum 32 km
Wijnaldum 35 km
Midlum-Herbaijum 36 km
Koetille 38 km
Harlingen 39 km.

St. Jacobiparochie - Berlikum line
Berlikum

Tzummarum - Franeker line
Dongjum 31 km
Franeker Halte 34 km

Accidents
On 12 June 1927, NS locomotive 7124 derailed near Holwerd and ended up on its side in a dike. The locomotive was recovered on 23 June and returned to service after repairs were made.

See also
Spoorlijn Leeuwarden - Anjum (Dokkumer Lokaaltje) 
Noord-Friesche Locaalspoorweg-Maatschappij 
Spoorlijn Stiens - Harlingen 
Spoorlijn Tzummarum - Franeker 
Information contained in the above articles has been used in compiling this article.
Spoar fan Ljouwert nei Eanjum

References

External links
 Stationsweb.nl Railway stations in Friesland 
 stichting Noord-Friesche Lokaal Spoorwegmaatschappij 

Defunct railroads
Standard gauge railways in the Netherlands
Nederlandse Spoorwegen
Railway companies of the Netherlands
History of Friesland
Railway lines in Friesland
Buildings and structures in Leeuwarden
Transport in Leeuwarden
Former Dutch railway company
NFLS